Murj-e Shahrak (also Romanized as Mūrj-e Shahrak; also known as Mūrch-e Shahrak and Mūrd-e Shahrak) is a village in Ahmadabad Rural District, in the Central District of Firuzabad County, Fars Province, Iran. At the 2006 census, its population was 761, in 151 families.

References 

Populated places in Firuzabad County